GLI  may refer to:

 Getty Leadership Institute at Claremont Graduate University
 Glen Innes Airport, in New South Wales, Australia
 Global Labour Institute, a British workers rights organization
 Great Lakes Initiative, a fictional superhero team
 Great Lakes Invitational, a college ice hockey tournament
 Greater Louisville Inc., an American business development organization
 Greyhound Lines, a North-American bus carrier
 Volkswagen GLI, an automobile
 GLI1, GLI2, GLI3, glioma-associated family of transcription factors